Kevin Oliver Thomas (born 20 June 1963) is a former English cricketer. Thomas was a right-handed batsman who bowled right-arm fast-medium. He was born in Mile End, London.

Thomas made his one and only first-class appearance for Essex in 1989 against the touring New Zealanders.

The following season, Thomas joined Cambridgeshire. During that season he made his only List A appearance in that format against Kent in the 1991 NatWest Trophy.

It was during the 1991 season that he made his Minor Counties Championship debut against Norfolk. From 1991 to 1992, he represented the county in 3 Championship matches, the last of which came against Suffolk. He made a single MCCA Knockout Trophy appearance against Norfolk in 1991.

References

External links
Kevin Thomas at Cricinfo
Kevin Thomas at CricketArchive

1963 births
Living people
People from Mile End
Cricketers from Greater London
English cricketers
Essex cricketers
Cambridgeshire cricketers